Gerd Barkman is a shooting competitor for New Zealand.

At the 1994 Commonwealth Games she won a silver medal in the 10m air pistol pairs with Jocelyn Lees. She also competed in the 10m  air pistol, coming 4th; the 25m sport pistol, coming 7th; and the 25m sport pistol pairs, coming 4th.

External links  
 

Living people
Year of birth missing (living people)
New Zealand female sport shooters
Commonwealth Games silver medallists for New Zealand
Shooters at the 1994 Commonwealth Games
Commonwealth Games medallists in shooting
Medallists at the 1994 Commonwealth Games